Mr Kneebone is the third EP by the Australian rock band Powderfinger. It was released after their first full-length studio album, Parables for Wooden Ears, and before the album, Double Allergic. It contains five songs, none of which were included on either album. The EP peaked at #83 on the Australian singles chart, and is considered to be "the turning point in Powderfinger's song writing career".

Background

Following the lack of success of their first album, Parables for Wooden Ears, and despite the moderate success of the EP that preceded it, Transfusion, Powderfinger decided to continue writing and improving their craft and recording music. The group returned to recording with Lachlan "Magoo" Goold, who had produced Transfusion, but chose to record in Metropolis Studios Melbourne where they had recorded Parables. Though the band was signed on a contral with the UK label Polydor Records, the group released the EP independently with the one-off label title Egg the Nest. Powderfinger officially released the EP at a party at the Roxy in the Valley in Brisbane on 28 July 1995, with local support acts Ammonia, Turtlebox and Webster. At the launch, the group performed songs from all of their releases, and played all of the songs from Mr Kneebone. A reviewer from the Australian rock music magazine Time Off commented that "they power into over-drive with the new "I'm Splitting Terry"," the EP's final song, with which the group opened the show. The reviewer said of the launch performance, "Powderfinger embody one of the most exciting futures of Australian rock music. They’re in their element playing loud and live."

Cover art
The cover art is an image of the title character Mr Kneebone and was painted by Jolyon Robinson. It was commonly believed to be an image of the group's lead vocalist, Bernard Fanning, but the band notes that this was never the intention while acknowledging the coincidental likeness. As the band are all avid cricket supporters, inside the album sleeve the band thanks, among others, Australian cricketers Mark and Steve Waugh.

Personnel

Powderfinger
Bernard Fanning – guitar and vocals
John Collins – bass guitar
Ian Haug – guitars
Darren Middleton – guitars
Jon Coghill – drums

Artwork
Art concept – Rachel Liddle, Travers Murr and Powderfinger
Graphics layout – Rachel Liddle
Paintings – Jolyon Robinson

Production
Recorded at Metropolis Studios, Melbourne
Produced by Lachlan 'Magoo' Goold and Powderfinger
Mixed and engineered by Goold and Andy Baldwin
Mastered at Studios 301 by Don Bartley

Track listing
All music written, arranged and performed by Bernard Fanning, John Collins, Ian Haug, Darren Middleton, Jon Coghill. Lyrics by Fanning.
 "Swollen Tongue" – 3:12
 "Stitches" – 3:51
 "Drongo" – 3:53
 "My Urn" – 4:25
 "I'm Splittin' Terry" – 3:05

Charts

References

Powderfinger albums
1995 EPs